Estrela da Calheta Futebol Clube, commonly known as Estrela da Calheta is a Portuguese football club from Calheta, Madeira. Founded in 1964, the club currently plays at the Campo Municipal dos Prazeres which holds a capacity of 800.

Honours
AF Madeira First Division
 Winners (1): 2003–04
AF Madeira Second Division
 Winners (1): 2007–08

References

External links
 Official site
 Profile at ZeroZero
 Profile at ForaDeJogo

Football clubs in Portugal
Sport in Madeira
Association football clubs established in 1931
1964 establishments in Portugal